Kihntagious is a 1984 studio album by the Greg Kihn Band. It is the last album to feature drummer and founding member Larry Lynch and keyboard player Gary Phillips.

The album was recorded in Studio “C” at Fantasy Studios in Berkeley, California.

Track listing

Personnel
The Greg Kihn Band
Greg Kihn - guitar, vocals
Greg Douglass - guitar, slide guitar, vocals
Larry Lynch - drums, vocals, co-lead vocals on "Hard Times"
Steve Wright - bass, vocals
Gary Phillips - keyboards

Production
Producer: Matthew King Kaufman

References

1984 albums
Greg Kihn albums
Beserkley Records albums